General Oscar Eugéne Nygren (26 September 1872 – 12 January 1960) was a Swedish Army officer. He was Chief of the General Staff from 1933 to 1937 and acting Chief of the Army from 1936 to 1937. Although retired from active service in 1937, he was called back in service after World War II broke out, as commander of the 2nd Army Corps. He finally retired from the Army in 1941.

Career

Military career
Nygren was born on 26 September 1872 in Gävle, Sweden, the son of Richard Nygren, a city broker, and his wife Thekla (née Engelmark). He became a second lieutenant in Hälsinge Regiment (I 14) in 1892 and studied at the Royal Swedish Army Staff College from 1896 to 1898 and was a cadet at the General Staff from 1898 to 1901. Nygren became a lieutenant at the General Staff in 1902 and was promoted to captain in 1904. He was adjutant to the head of the Ministry of Land Defence from 1907 to 1910 and was transferred to Hälsinge Regiment (I 14) in 1909. Nygren was major at the General Staff in 1912 and was appointed Chief of Staff in the III Army Division in 1912.

He was Vice Chief of the Military Office of the Ministry of Land Defence in 1915 and was lieutenant colonel at the General Staff in 1915. Nygren was appointed head of the Royal Swedish Army Staff College in 1917 and conducted study trips to Germany, Bulgaria, Turkey, the Western Front and the Macedonian front in 1918. Back in Sweden he became colonel in the General Staff in 1919. He was appointed Chief of the Military Office of the Ministry of Land Defence in 1919 conducted a study trip to the Italian Front in 1922. Back in Sweden he became executive officer of the Svea Life Guards (I 1) in 1923.

Nygren was appointed commanding officer of the 7th Infantry Brigade in 1926 and Commandant in Boden Fortress in 1928. He was promoted to major general in 1929 and was appointed military commander of Upper Norrland's Troops in 1930. Nygren was after that Chief of the General Staff from 1933 to 1937 and acting Chief of the Army from 1936 to 1937 when he was promoted to lieutenant general. He was promoted to general upon retirement in 1937 and was placed in the reserve the year after. In 1939, when World War II broke out, Nygren was appointed commander of the newly formed 2nd Army Corps in Upper Norrland and in 1940 he became commanding officer of the same in West Sweden. Nygren left the position in August 1941.

Other work
Nygren was military member of the Supreme Court from 1934 to 1954. He was military expert for the committee on the League of Nations and for Sweden's representative at the League of Nations' council meeting in Geneva in 1922. Nygren was Swedish member of the League of Nations' permanent advisory military committee and assistant to the Swedish representative in the League of Nations' disarmament commission. He was also chairman of the board the pension insurance company Allmänna pensionsförsäkringsbolaget.

Nygren became a member of the Royal Swedish Academy of War Sciences in 1919.

Personal life
In 1905 he married Jenny Öhgren (1886–1959), the daughter of rådmannen G. A. Öhgren and Ina (née Granberg). He was the father of colonel Hans Nygren (1906–1982).

Death
Nygren died on 12 January 1960 in Stockholm and was buried in Norra begravningsplatsen in Stockholm.

Dates of rank
11 November 1892 – Underlöjtnant
7 August 1896 – Lieutenant 2nd Class
9 November 1900 – Lieutenant 1st Class
31 December 1904 – Captain
20 November 1909 – Captain 1st Class
10 January 1913 – Major
17 December 1915 – Lieutenant colonel
16 July 1919 – Colonel
22 November 1929 – Major general
1 July 1936 – Lieutenant general
1 October 1937 – General

Awards and decorations
Nygren's awards:

Swedish
   Commander Grand Cross of the Order of the Sword
   Commander 2nd Class of the Order of Vasa
   Knight of the Order of the Polar Star
  Landstorm Gold Medal (Landstorm-guldmedalj)
  Voluntary Motor Transportation Corps' Gold Medal  (Frivilliga automobilkårens guldmedalj)

Foreign
  Grand Cross of the Order of the White Rose of Finland
  Grand Cross of the Order of Polonia Restituta
  Commander 1st Class of the Order of the Dannebrog
  Commander with Star of the Order of St. Olav
  Commander with Sword of the Order of Saint Alexander
  1st Class of the Order of Merit
  Commander of the Legion of Honour
  Commander of the Order of the Black Star
  Commander of the Order of the Crown of Italy
  Commander with Sword of the Order of Orange-Nassau
  3rd Class with Sword of the Order of Osmanieh
  Knight 1st Class of the Order of the Zähringer Lion
  Knight of the 3rd Class of the Order of the Crown
  Knight 3rd Class of the Order of Saint Anna
  1st Class of  the Austrian Red Cross' Badge of Honor

References

External links
Article in Svenskt biografiskt lexikon 

1872 births
1960 deaths
Swedish Army generals
Chiefs of Army (Sweden)
Burials at Norra begravningsplatsen
People from Gävle
Members of the Royal Swedish Academy of War Sciences
Commanders Grand Cross of the Order of the Sword
Commanders Second Class of the Order of Vasa
Knights of the Order of the Polar Star